Taqi Dizaj (also Romanized as Taqī Dīzaj; also known as Taqī Dīzeh (Persian: تقی ديزه) and Nagdīzsī) is a village in Arshaq Sharqi Rural District, in the Central District of Ardabil County, Ardabil Province, Iran. At the 2006 census, its population was 415, in 91 families.

References 

Towns and villages in Ardabil County